Trimethylphosphine is a neutral organophosphorus compound with the formula P(CH3)3, commonly abbreviated as PMe3.  This colorless liquid has a strongly unpleasant odor, characteristic of alkylphosphines.  The compound is a common ligand in coordination chemistry.

Structure and bonding
It is a pyramidal molecule with approximate C3v symmetry. The C–P–C bond angles are approximately 98.6°.

The C–P–C bond angles are consistent with the notion that phosphorus predominantly uses the 3p orbitals for forming bonds and that there is little sp hybridization of the phosphorus atom. The latter is a common feature of the chemistry of phosphorus. As a result, the lone pair of trimethylphosphine has predominantly s-character as is the case for phosphine, PH3.

PMe3 can be prepared by the treatment of triphenyl phosphite with methylmagnesium chloride:

 3 CH3MgCl + P(OC6H5)3 → P(CH3)3 + 3 C6H5OMgCl
The synthesis is conducted in dibutyl ether, from which the more volatile PMe3 can be distilled.

Reactions

With a pKa of 8.65, PMe3 reacts with strong acids to give salts [HPMe3]X. This reaction is reversible. With strong bases, such as alkyl lithium compounds, a methyl group undergoes deprotonation to give PMe2CH2Li.

PMe3 is easily oxidised to the phosphine oxide with oxygen. It reacts with methyl bromide to give tetramethylphosphonium bromide.

Coordination chemistry
Trimethylphosphine is a highly basic ligand that forms complexes with most metals.  As a ligand, trimethylphosphine's Tolman cone angle is 118°. This angle is an indication of the amount of steric protection that this ligand provides to the metal that to which it is bound.

Being a relatively compact phosphine, several can bind to a single transition metal, as illustrated by the existence of Pt(PEt3)4. Its complex with silver iodide, AgI(PMe3) is an air-stable solid that releases PMe3 upon heating.

Safety
PMe3 is toxic and pyrophoric. It converts to a much safer phosphine oxide upon treatment with sodium hypochlorite or hydrogen peroxide.

References

Tertiary phosphines
Foul-smelling chemicals